Rediffusion Singapore (Chinese: 丽的呼声), started in 1949, was the first cable-transmitted radio station in Singapore. It was a Singapore subsidiary of the Broadcast Relay Services (Overseas) Ltd. It was also Singapore's only subscription radio service. Due to decreasing subscription, it closed in 2012. On closure, a former Rediffusion Singapore deejay, Eva Chang Mei Hsiang, bought the radio station and in 2013 re-opened the radio station as an online radio station.

Rediffusion Singapore was founded in 1949 as a result of the success encountered in radio broadcasting in Singapore, particularly in the post-World War II era. The cable radio service was seen as a remedy against poor reception which affected certain housing estates until then. Rediffusion Singapore was operated by Overseas Rediffusion, a subsidiary of the Rediffusion broadcasting business based in the United Kingdom, from the former's foundation until the late 1980s, when the British-owned Rediffusion conglomerate was broken up. 

Since 2000, Rediffusion Singapore provided digital radio services in Singapore. 

On 15 April 2005, the Media Development Authority issued a five-year licence to Rediffusion Singapore for a subscriber-only Digital Audio Broadcasting service, making it the world's first. 

Rediffusion went off-air on 30 April 2012 but it resumed broadcasting on 11 November 2013 using the internet to transmit their programs.

See also 
 Rediffusion
 Associated-Rediffusion
 Rediffusion Television (Hong Kong, now known as Asia Television)
 Red FM (Malaysia): former Rediffusion Malaysia
 Starcom Network - formerly Radio Distribution (Barbados) Limited

References

External links 
 
  Remembering Rediffusion Singapore by Gerald K Clode
 Official Facebook

Radio stations in Singapore
Broadcasting in Singapore
Cable radio
Digital-only radio stations